Rose Manor is an historic building in Victoria, British Columbia, Canada.  It is a retirement residence with interior features including a rotunda and a stained-glass skylight.

See also
 List of historic places in Victoria, British Columbia

References

External links
 

Buildings and structures in Victoria, British Columbia